Dennis Thompson (born September 7, 1948) is an American drummer, most famous for being a member of the 1960s–70s Detroit proto-punk/hard rock group MC5, which had a No. 82 US single with "Kick Out the Jams" and a No. 30 US album with the same name.

Biography
Thompson began playing drums by the time he was nine years old. Joining the MC5 by 1965, Thompson was later given the nickname "Machine Gun" because of his "assault" style of fast, hard-hitting drumming that sonically resembles the sound of his namesake Thompson machine gun (commonly referred to as a "Tommy Gun"). His drumming pre-figured and influenced punk, metal, and hardcore punk drumming styles.

After MC5 broke up in the early 1970s, Thompson was a member of the 1975–1976 Los Angeles–based supergroup The New Order, the 1981 Australia-based supergroup New Race, The Motor City Bad Boys, and The Secrets. In 2001, he guested for Asmodeus X on the song "The Tiger" (St. Thomas Records).

His influences include Elvin Jones, Keith Moon and Mitch Mitchell, and Motown. In 2015, he described how his drumming technique had changed considerably over time, playing with "much less force and tucked in elbows, more wrist action and less arm action".

Thompson was in the band DKT/MC5 with the surviving members of MC5, from 2003–2012. Later, he recorded two tracks for a new MC5 album scheduled for October 2022 release, although as of February 2023 the album has not yet been released.

References

External links
 official website
 Interview with Jarrod Dicker (2009)

1948 births
American punk rock singers
Living people
MC5 members
American people of Slovak descent
Protopunk musicians
American male drummers
American punk rock drummers
American rock drummers
Singers from Detroit
The New Order (band) members
20th-century American drummers
New Race members
20th-century American male musicians